Quy Nhơn Stadium is a multi-use stadium in Quy Nhơn, Bình Định Vietnam. It is mostly used for football matches and is the home stadium of Topenland Bình Định. The stadium holds 20,000 people.

Football venues in Vietnam
Buildings and structures in Bình Định province